The 2019 Sudamérica Rugby Women's Sevens (Montevideo) was the 18th edition of the Sudamérica Women's Sevens and was held in Montevideo, Uruguay from 8–9 November. Brazil defeated Argentina in the final to win their 17th Sudamérica title.

Teams 
Nine teams competed in the tournament.

Pool stage

Pool A

Pool B

Pool C

Finals

Challenge pool

Gold pool

3rd Place Playoff

Gold Final

Final standings

References 

2019 in women's rugby union
2019 rugby sevens competitions
Rugby sevens competitions in South America
2019 in South American rugby union
November 2019 sports events in South America